The 1987–88 All-Ireland Senior Club Hurling Championship was the 18th staging of the All-Ireland Senior Club Hurling Championship, the Gaelic Athletic Association's premier inter-county club hurling tournament. The championship began on 23 August 1987 and ended on 17 March 1988.

Borris-Ileigh of Tipperary were the defending champions, however, they failed to qualify after being defeated by Lorrha in the North Tipperary Championship.

On 17 March 1988, Midleton won the championship after a 3-08 to 0-09 defeat of Athenry in the All-Ireland final at Croke Park. It remains their only championship title.

Athenry's P. J. Molloy was the championship's top scorer with 0-31.

Results

Connacht Senior Club Hurling Championship

First round

Second round

Semi-final

Final

Leinster Senior Club Hurling Championship

Preliminary round

First round

Quarter-finals

Semi-finals

Final

Munster Senior Club Hurling Championship

First round

Semi-finals

Final

Ulster Senior Club Hurling Championship

First round

Second round

Semi-finals

Final

All-Ireland Senior Club Hurling Championship

Quarter-final

Semi-finals

Final

References

1987 in hurling
1988 in hurling
All-Ireland Senior Club Hurling Championship